Sorbus is a genus of over 100 species of trees and shrubs in the rose family, Rosaceae.  Species of Sorbus (s.l.) are commonly known as whitebeam, rowan (mountain-ash) and service tree.  The exact number of species is disputed depending on the circumscription of the genus, and also due to the number of apomictic microspecies, which some treat as distinct species, but others group in a smaller number of variable species.  Recent treatments classify Sorbus in a narrower sense to include only the pinnate leaved species of subgenus Sorbus, raising several of the other subgenera to generic rank.  

Sorbus is not closely related to the true ash trees which belong to the genus Fraxinus, although the leaves are superficially similar.

Genus
As treated in its broad sense, the genus is divided into two main and three or four small subgenera (with more recent generic assignments in parentheses):

Sorbus subgenus Sorbus (genus Sorbus s.s.), commonly known as the rowan (primarily in the UK) or mountain-ash (in Ireland, North America and the UK), with compound leaves usually hairless or thinly hairy below; fruit carpels not fused; the type is Sorbus aucuparia (European rowan). Distribution: cool-temperate Northern Hemisphere. (Genus Sorbus s.s.)
Sorbus subgenus Aria (genus Aria), the whitebeam, with simple leaves usually strongly white-hairy below (hence the name, from German Weissbaum, 'white tree'); fruit carpels not fused; the type is  Sorbus aria (common whitebeam). Distribution: temperate Europe & Asia.

Sorbus subgenus Micromeles (genus Micromeles), an indistinct group of a few east Asian species (e.g. Sorbus alnifolia, Korean whitebeam) with narrow leaves; doubtfully distinct from and often included in subgenus Aria. Distribution: temperate northeast Asia.

Sorbus subgenus Cormus (genus Cormus), with compound leaves similar to subgenus Sorbus, but with distinct fused carpels in the fruit; just one species, Sorbus domestica (True Service Tree). Distribution: North Africa, warm-temperate Europe, West Asia.
Sorbus subgenus Torminaria (genus Torminalis), with rather maple-like lobed leaves with pointed lobes; fruit carpels not fused; just one species, Sorbus torminalis (Wild Service Tree). Distribution: temperate Europe, south to the mountains of North Africa and east to the Caucasus ranges.
Sorbus subgenus Chamaemespilus (genus Chamaemespilus), a single shrubby species Sorbus chamaemespilus (false medlar) with simple, glabrous leaves and pink flowers with erect sepals and petals. Distribution: mountains of southern Europe.
Sorbus subgenus Umbellata (genus Umbellata), Sorbus umbellata ssp. flabellifolia has oval with saw-like indentations along the upper edges of the leaf. It produces an edible but not high quality fruit. Distribution: mountains of Lebanon and specifically Ehden and Shouf Nature Reserves at elevations between 1300 to 1800 meters.
Hybrids are common in the genus, including many between the subgenera; very often these hybrids are apomictic (self-fertile without pollination), so able to reproduce clonally from seed without any variation. This has led to a very large number of microspecies, particularly in western Europe (including Britain) and parts of China.

Sorbus species are used as food plants by the larvae of some moth species—see list of Lepidoptera that feed on Sorbus. Sorbus domestica is used to flavour some apple wines, see Apfelwein.

Species

Uses

Ornamental trees 
Sorbus species are cultivated as ornamental trees for parks and gardens and as avenue trees, and have given rise to several cultivars. The following, of mixed or uncertain parentage, have gained the Royal Horticultural Society’s Award of Garden Merit: 
’Eastern Promise’ (purple autumn colour, pink berries)
’Leonard Messel’ (small tree to 4m, pink berries)
’Wisley Gold’  (yellow berries)

Gallery

References

9. Sorbus Umbellata  
10. Sorbus Umbellata

Further reading

Price, D.T. 2007. One-way introgressive hybridisation between Sorbus aria and S. torminalis (Rosaceae) in southern Britain. Watsonia. 26: 419–431.

 
Rosaceae genera
Taxa named by Carl Linnaeus